The Sassoon Mausoleum is the former grave of Sir Albert Sassoon and other members of his family, including Sir Edward Sassoon, 2nd Baronet, of Kensington Gore. It stands at 83 St. George's Road in Brighton, England. The single-storey building, which is Grade II listed, has since served as a furniture depository and an air-raid shelter, and since being purchased by a brewery in 1949 has remained a pub or bar.

History

Albert Abdullah David Sassoon was born in Baghdad in 1818  to a prominent,  Sephardic Jewish family.  After many years spent managing the family's banking and merchant shipping business in Bombay, India, he retired to England where he was created a baronet. He died in Brighton in 1896.

The mausoleum was built in 1892 as a wing of the family home located at 1 Eastern Terrace.  The Sassoons are known to have received many distinguished visitors, including Edward VII twice, while he was Prince of Wales. The house no longer survives. In 1933 the remains of the Sassoon family were removed and reburied at the Liberal Jewish Cemetery, Willesden in London.

The former mausoleum was for a time a furniture depository. During World War II it was used as an air raid shelter during fierce bombings. In 1949 it was purchased by a brewery for use as a pub – The Bombay Bar. In 2001 the mausoleum housed the Brighton Arms pub. In 2003 it was bought and the name changed to "The Hanbury Club".

In 2006 the mausoleum, which is located in the Kemptown neighbourhood of Brighton, underwent a £60,000 refurbishment. The new decor was intended to evoke the supper clubs of the 1920s and 1930s, and the venue featured live performances of contemporary music. In 2011 the mausoleum reopened as Proud Cabaret Brighton.

Architecture

The mausoleum is a single-storey building notable for its  "flamboyant" trumpet-shaped, Indo-Saracenic dome. The copper dome was originally covered in gold leaf. The Indo-Saracenic theme is carried out in lotus-leaf crenellations along the parapet and the lobed arches of the front door. The colourful "Bollywood" ceiling murals were applied by a later owner and are not original to the mausoleum.

The circle of pointed horseshoe arch windows on the drum of the dome were restored in the early 21st century.

The mausoleum, now a Grade II listed building, was designed as an enlarged replica of the marble mausoleum in the courtyard of the Ohel David Synagogue at Poona where Sassoon's father, David Sassoon, was buried.

See also
Grade II listed buildings in Brighton and Hove: S

References

External links
 
 Proud Cabaret Brighton
 Robert Stuart Nemeth's Building Opinions

1892 establishments in England
Air raid shelters in the United Kingdom
Burials at Liberal Jewish Cemetery, Willesden
Grade II listed buildings in Brighton and Hove
Jewish mausoleums
Jews and Judaism in England
Mausoleums in England
Pubs in Brighton and Hove